Stanage is a coastal rural town and locality in the Livingstone Shire, Queensland, Australia.

Geography 
Stanage is at the head of the Torilla Peninsula jutting north into the Coral Sea with Broad Sound to the west and Shoalwater Bay to the east. The town is on the northernmost tip of the peninsula split across three areas of housing, one on the north-west side of the tip facing Thirsty Sound and two on the north-east side. The area is a popular weekend retreat from Rockhampton and offers fishing and crabbing.

On the eastern Shoalwater Bay side of the peninsula are six disconnected sections of land collectively constituting the Shoalwater Conservation Park.

Apart from the residential areas of the town and the conservation park, the remainder of the land within locality is used for grazing on native vegetation.

Mainland coastal features 
Having such a large coast, there are many named headlands and other coastal features including:

 Arthur Point is a point
 Broome Head is a cape
 Island Bluff is a cliff
 Macdonald Point is a point
 Pier Head is a cape
 Stanage Point is a point.

Mountains 
There are also a number of named mountains:

 Campbell Peak is a peak
 Corisande Hills is a hill
 Fort Cope is a mountain
 Jessie Peak is a peak
 Price Mountain is a mountain
 Roger Hills is a mountain range
 The Gemini is a mountain
 Torilla Hill is a hill

Islands and island features 
The extent of the locality extends into the Coral Sea and incorporates many island groups and individual islands and rocks:

Island groups 

 Cannibal Group is an island group
 Annie Island is an island
 Collins Island is an island
 Eliza Island is an island
 Holt Island is an island
 Lingham Island is an island
 Mumford Island is an island
 Duke Islands is an island group
 Bamborough Island is an island
 Coquet Island is an island
 Eagle Islet
 Hunter Island is an island
 Quarry Point is a point
 Marble Island is an island
 Morkar Islet is an island
 Tynemouth Island is an island
 North Point Isles is an island group
 Bush Island is an island
 Falcon Island
 Infelix Islets is an island group
 Turn Island is an island
 Wild Duck Island is an island
 Cliff Head is a cape

Individual islands, cays and rocks 
 Alnwick Island is an island
 Barren Island is an island
 Black Swan Rock is a rock
 Coal Island is an island
 Comet Rock is a rock
 Danger Island is an island
 Double Rocks is a rock
 Five Trees Cay is a cay
 Gannet Rock is a rock
 Hexham Island is an island
 Iron Islet is an island
 Long Island is an island
 North Point is a point
 Southport Hill is a hill
 Low Island is an island
 Mangrove Island is an island
 Narrows Rock is a rock
 North Point Cays is a cay
 North Rock is a rock
 Otterbourne Island is an island
 Quail Island is an island
 Lucy Ravel Point is a point
 Race Rocks is a rock
 Shields Island is an island
 South Barren Island is an island
 Steep Island is an island
 Table Rock is a rock
 Tail Rock is a rock
 Ten Pin Rock is a rock
 Tide Island is an island
 Till Rock is a rock
 Two Round Rocks is a rock
 
 West Side Island is an island
 White Rocks is a rock
 Woods Island is an island

Marine features 
The extension into the Coral Sea also includes a number of marine features:

 Broad Sound Channel is a channel
 Burkitt Roads is an anchorage
 Connor Banks is a marine bank
 Crooked Sands is a marine bank
 Curlew Sand is a marine bank
 Long Bank is a marine bank
 Middle Passage is a passage
 North Channel is a channel
 North Point Passage is a passage
 North West Channel is a channel
 Pearl Passage is a channel
 Race Passage is a passage
 Sand Bank Bay is a bay
 Stanage Bay is a bay
 Thirsty Sound is a sound

History 
Stanage was created on 15 July 1989 to include the former localities of Plumtree, Alligator Bay and Alligator Point. The name refers to Stanage Park, an estate in Radnorshire, Wales owned by the Coltman Rogers family, who were involved in Torilla pastoral run from 1860.

Amenities 
There is a volunteer-run library supported by the Livingstone Shire Council.

There is a public boat ramp at Banksia Road.

Education 
There are no schools in Stanage. The nearest primary school is Marlborough State School in neighbouring Marlborough,  to the south-west. The nearest secondary schools are in Rockhampton,  to the south, so distance education and boarding schools are the alternatives.

References

External links 
 

Towns in Queensland
Shire of Livingstone
Coastline of Queensland
Localities in Queensland